The De Morgan Medal is a prize for outstanding contribution to mathematics, awarded by the London Mathematical Society. The Society's most prestigious award, it is given in memory of Augustus De Morgan, who was the first President of the society.

The medal is awarded every third year (in years divisible by 3) to a mathematician who is normally resident in the United Kingdom on 1 January of the relevant year. The only grounds for the award of the medal are the candidate's contributions to mathematics.

In 1968, Mary Cartwright became the first woman to receive the award.

De Morgan Medal winners
Recipients of the De Morgan Medal include the following:

See also
 Whitehead Prize
 Fröhlich Prize
 Senior Whitehead Prize
 Berwick Prize
 Naylor Prize and Lectureship
 Pólya Prize (LMS)
 List of mathematics awards

References

British science and technology awards
Awards established in 1884
Triennial events
Awards of the London Mathematical Society
1884 establishments in the United Kingdom